Baykov Leonid Petrovich (July 28, 1919, Vyshny Volochyok, RSFSR — July 28, 1994, Saint Petersburg) was a Russian and Soviet painter, a member of the Leningrad Union of Soviet Artists, who lived and worked in Saint Petersburg (former Leningrad), regarded as one of representatives of the Leningrad School of Painting. Participated in exhibitions since 1943. Important exhibitions: "All-Union Art Exhibition", Moscow, 1951.

See also 
 Leningrad School of Painting
 House of creativity «Staraya Ladoga»
 List of Russian artists
 List of 20th-century Russian painters
 List of painters of Saint Petersburg Union of Artists
 Saint Petersburg Union of Artists

References

Sources 
 Центральный Государственный Архив литературы и искусства. СПб. Ф.78. Оп.8. Д.205.
 Весенняя выставка произведений ленинградских художников 1954 года. Каталог. Л., Изогиз, 1954. С.7-8.
 Весенняя выставка произведений ленинградских художников 1955 года. Каталог. Л., ЛССХ, 1956. С.7.
 Осенняя выставка произведений ленинградских художников 1956 года. Каталог. Л., Ленинградский художник, 1958. С.6.
 1917 — 1957. Выставка произведений ленинградских художников. Каталог. Л., Ленинградский художник, 1958. С.8.
 Осенняя выставка произведений ленинградских художников 1958 года. Каталог. Л., Художник РСФСР, 1959. С.6.
 Выставка произведений ленинградских художников 1960 года. Каталог. Л., Художник РСФСР, 1961. С.9.
 Выставка произведений ленинградских художников 1961 года. Каталог. Л., Художник РСФСР, 1964. С.9.
 Ленинград. Зональная выставка 1964 года. Каталог. Л, Художник РСФСР, 1965. C.9.
 Художники народов СССР. Биобиблиографический словарь. Т. 1. М., Искусство, 1970. С. 260-261.
 Весенняя выставка произведений ленинградских художников. Каталог. - Л: Художник РСФСР, 1974. - с.6.
 Наш современник. Зональная выставка произведений ленинградских художников 1975 года. Каталог. Л., Художник РСФСР, 1980. C.11.
 Выставка произведений ленинградских художников, посвящённая 60-летию Великого Октября. Л., Художник РСФСР, 1982. С.11.
 Directory of Members of the Union of Artists of USSR. Vol. 1. - Moscow: Soviet artist, 1979. P.84.
 Зональная выставка произведений ленинградских художников 1980 года. Каталог. Л., Художник РСФСР, 1983. C.9.
 Directory of members of the Leningrad branch of Union of Artists of Russian Federation. - Leningrad: Khudozhnik RSFSR, 1987. P.10.
 Matthew Cullerne Bown. A Dictionary of Twentieth Century Russian And Soviet Painters. 1900 — 1980s. — London: Izomar Limited, 1998.
 Летописцы флота России. 50 лет Студии художников-маринистов Военно-морского флота. СПб, ЦВММ. 2002. С. 8, 20, 50.
 Sergei V. Ivanov. Unknown Socialist Realism. The Leningrad School. Saint Petersburg, NP-Print Edition, 2007. P.393, 400. , .
 Юбилейный Справочник выпускников Санкт-Петербургского академического института живописи, скульптуры и архитектуры имени И. Е. Репина Российской Академии художеств. 1915—2005. — Санкт Петербург: «Первоцвет», 2007. — с.67.

1919 births
1994 deaths
People from Vyshny Volochyok
Soviet military personnel of World War II
Socialist realist artists
20th-century Russian painters
Russian male painters
Soviet painters
Members of the Leningrad Union of Artists
Repin Institute of Arts alumni
Leningrad School artists
20th-century Russian male artists